The mothers' movement included far-right isolationist women's groups in the United States, beginning in California in 1939, soon after the start of World War II. At its height, it consisted of 50 to 100 loosely-confederated groups, with a total membership that may have been as high as five or six million. Members were typically white middle-class middle-aged Christian women.

They organised petitions and demonstrations, published propaganda, and were active in political campaigns. They are credited with having delayed US assistance to the Allies. Their activity declined after the Great Sedition Trial of 1944, but their leaders' opposition to the war continued.

Beginning
The movement originated in 1939 in Los Angeles, California, with the National League of Mothers of America. It gradually grew into a loose confederation of 50 to 100 groups that developed on the West Coast, the Midwest, and the East Coast. The members of these groups were largely white middle-aged middle-class Christian women; their leaders were exclusively college-educated upper-middle-class Christians. The groups published books, pamphlets, and newsletters opposed to the war. The members testified before congress, picketed the White House, collected petitions, and participated in political campaigns. The leaders most likely learned their organizing experience from women's clubs, political parties, or movements led by men.

Great Sedition Trial
The mother's movement was involved in the Great Sedition Trial of 1944 in which the government charged an assortment of 30 heterogeneous individuals with violations of the Smith Act of 1940 and the Sedition Act of 1917. The defendants were held to be pro-fascist participants in a Nazi conspiracy. US President Franklin D. Roosevelt pressured US Attorney General Francis Biddle into indicting the activists for sedition. Some of the leaders called to testify before the grand jury were Elizabeth Dilling, Cathrine Curtis, and Lyrl Clark Van Hyning.

A mistrial was declared on November 29, 1944, sometime after the death of the trial judge, ex-Representative Edward C. Eicher.

End
The mother's movement failed to accomplish its main goal of ending involvement in World War II, which led to the declining enthusiasm for the cause. The movement slowly diminished after the war ended. The leaders mostly dispersed into different paths, and most of them lost the distinction that they once had during the 1930s and the 1940s.

References

Sources

Lawrence, Dennis, and Maximilian John St. George. A Trial on Trial; the Great Sedition Trial of 1944. National Civil Rights Committee, 1946.
Berkowitz, June Melby. Days of Discontent:American Women and Right-Wing Politics, 1933–1945. Northern Illinois University Press, 2002
Frost, J.(2010). Dissent and Consent in the "Good War": Hedda Hopper, Hollywood Gossip, and World War II Isolationism. Film History: An International Journal 22(2), 170–181. Indiana University Press

External links
 A Brief History of WWII
 Women and World War II – Opponents
 Women and the Home Front During World War II
 FBI files on Lyrl Clark Van Hyning with copies of Women's Voice obtained through the FOIA and hosted at the Internet Archive:
Part 1
Part 2

Far-right organizations in the United States
Opposition to World War II
Peace organizations based in the United States
American anti-war activists
Old Right (United States)